Tantallon is an unincorporated community in Prince George's County, Maryland,  United States.  Although a separate community, it is a part of the census-designated place (CDP) of Fort Washington. The ZIP code for the community is 20744. Tantallon reported as a census-designated place by the U.S. Census Bureau in 1980, which included much of the northern half of Fort Washington's census area. The population recorded was 9,945.

Geography
Tantallon is located at 38.7 degrees north, 77.0 degrees west (38.724, −77.01); or approximately 12 miles south-southeast of Washington, D.C. The elevation for the community is 39 feet above sea level.

Education
The community of Tantallon is served by the Prince George's County Public Schools system, which serves the entire county.

References

Unincorporated communities in Prince George's County, Maryland
Unincorporated communities in Maryland
Former census-designated places in Maryland
Washington metropolitan area
Maryland populated places on the Potomac River